Parliamentary elections were held in Hungary between 1 and 10 June 1910. The result was a surprise victory for the National Party of Work, which won 256 of the 413 seats.

Results

Parliamentary
Hungary
Elections in Hungary
Elections in Austria-Hungary
Hungary

hu:Magyarországi országgyűlési választások a dualizmus korában#1910